The Boulevard Gardens Historic District is an historic district roughly bounded by Quayle Avenue, Main and West Temple Streets, in Salt Lake City, Utah. The district was listed on the National Register of Historic Places on December 31, 2018.

References

Historic districts in Utah
Salt Lake City